The Koosh Kins were a variation on the popular Koosh ball, featuring faces and hands. They were originally created as a set of six characters, then released with variant colors.

The characters were featured in a four-part comic book mini-series released by Archie Comics, as well as a series of coloring books. In that series, they lived on the planet Koosh, a large Koosh ball planetoid that, in lieu of a proper orbit, bounced against other planets to travel across the universe. While exploring a volcano, the Koosh Kins were flung into space, where they landed on Earth, in the company of downtrodden everyman Zak Taylor. Predictably, hilarity ensued, with the Koosh Kins aiding Zak in his acquisition of a girlfriend, and the aliens discovering a taste for hip hop and pizza.

Koosh Kins characters
T.K. - the stereotypical cool character, this toy's molded face sported perpetual sunglasses. In the comic, he often abbreviated his long strings of slang into a series of letters standing for each word. His colors were a light blue face and hands paired with a darker blue body.
Scopes - the only character without a humanoid face, Scopes had two periscope-style eyes, similar to cartoon depictions of a crab, rising from the top of the Koosh ball. In the comics, he never spoke, but featured word balloons with question marks from time to time. His eyestalks and hands were dark blue, and his ball was green.
Grinby - all yellow (hands and faces), Grinby was the down-to-earth but physically strong character.
Slats - almost the Reggie Mantle of the group, Slats was portrayed as sly. His colors were green for face and hands, and purple for his ball. He is shown in the comics as sweet on Gee Gee.
Gee Gee - the female of the group, she featured a predictable pink hue on her ball, with darker pink hands and face. In the comics, she's displayed as sweet and long-suffering.
Boingo - with a predilection for parties and pizza, Boingo was the stereotypical wacky member of the group, always ready to explode into feverish energy. His coloring was red.

External links
 Article in Time Magazine Archives

Toy brands